This is a list of yearly Southern California Intercollegiate Athletic Conference football standings.

SCIAC standings

References

Southern California Intercollegiate Athletic Conference
Standings